was a Japanese naval aviator and fighter ace of the Imperial Japanese Navy during World War II. Sasai was killed leading his fighter squadron during an attack on Henderson Field during the Battle of Guadalcanal.

Early life

Junichi Sasai was born on February 13, 1918, in Tokyo. He was the son of a captain of the Japanese Imperial Navy, and even in his youth, Sasai was destined to enter the navy. Sasai's childhood was marked by poor health, and he was always mobbed by his classmates. Physical exercises like judo, together with a balanced diet, improved his health. Sasai attended Tokyo Municipal High School No. 1.

He went on to the Imperial Japanese Naval Academy at Etajima, an island off the coast of Kure, Hiroshima. Junichi Sasai held a black belt in judo and competed in wrestling. In his early days at the Eta Jima Academy, he earned the nickname "gamecock" because of his stamina and vehemence for life.  After graduating from the 67th Naval Academy Class (ranking 152 out of 248 Cadets) and being appointed an ensign (少尉) in 1939, Sasai enrolled in the 35th Aviation Student Course. He finished his naval aviation training in November 1941 and became a fighter pilot. Sasai's brother-in-law, Lieutenant Commander Yoshio Tashiro, was also a naval aviator, serving as a flying boat commander.

World War II

On December 10, 1941, Ensign Sasai, as a member of the Tainan Air Group, which would become one of the Navy's premier fighter units, participated in the Pacific War's opening actions in the Philippines during the attack on Luzon, but he was forced to abort the mission due to engine trouble. On February 2, 1942, Sasai got his first aerial kill in the Dutch East Indies at Maospati airfield, Java, when he downed a Dutch Brewster Buffalo. Sixteen days later, Sasai knocked down a Curtiss P-40E of 17th Squadron, with the machine guns of his Mitsubishi A6M Zero.

Papua New Guinea

The Tainan Kōkūtai (Air Group) was transferred to Lae on Papua New Guinea in March 1942, reorganizing with new officers. Among his Tainan equals, Sasai was known as "Flying Tiger", a reference to the tiger-head belt buckle he wore always, a gift from his father. In his lodgings, he kept an image of Minamoto no Yoshitsune, the legendary Japanese war hero.

Already a lieutenant (j.g.), Sasai became Buntaicho (squadron leader), leading the 3rd Chutai (squadron), consisting of six planes, divided in two Shotai's (sections). Each squadron leader's Zero was recognisable by two light blue diagonal stripes across its fuselage, while each section leader's bore one. On each tail, there was a black letter V, the Tainan Group identifier, followed by a three-digit number in the 100s series identifying each aircraft. Sasai was now flying with experienced pilots in his squadron, including Saburō Sakai, Enji Kakimoto and Toshio Ohta.  Saburō Sakai, leading the second section in Sasai's squadron, was an experienced aviator, having flown aerial combat since early in the Second Sino-Japanese War in 1938 and 1939. Sasai learned the art of aerial combat from the experienced Sakai and the two of them became a great team. Sasai became an ace pilot and owed his life and much of his development as a fighter pilot to Sakai.

Sasai was considered an exceptional officer by his subordinates, mainly for his compassionate qualities. In private, he ridiculed the inflexibility and austerity of the navy caste system. Such disdain was demonstrated amply by the level of personal interest he took in his NCO subordinates. The Japanese caste system was strict, but Sasai cared more for his fliers. Saburō Sakai, flying as a warrant officer and section leader in Sasai's squadron, said in an interview:

On April 11, Lieutenant Sasai led nine Zeros scouting over Moresby in three "V" formations. The Japanese had not adopted the finger-four formation that had become common practice in Europe, instead flying in sections of three planes in a staggered formation, the second plane about one hundred yards behind and above the leader and the third on the other side another hundred yards further away, both wingmen weaving as they kept watch for enemy aircraft.

On May 4, 1942, Sasai became an ace, when he shot down three Bell P-39 Airacobras in only 20 seconds. On May 24, Sasai downed a North American B-25 Mitchell from the 13th US Squadron, 3rd Bomb Group.

On July 11, 1942, Lieutenant (j.g.) Sasai led 12 Zeros providing fighter escort for 21 bombers from Rabaul heading for Port Moresby. En route, they encountered six Boeing B-17 Flying Fortresses of the 19th Bomb Group. Sasai gave the order to attack the B-17s, so Sakai, Nishizawa, Ohta and two others joined Sasai.  They failed to shoot down any of the B-17s, and lost one of their Zeros in the effort. The dissipation of the close air support  fighters left the bomber attack subject to interdiction by Port Moresby's fighters, and the attack was disrupted. Sasai received a severe reprimand for leaving his bombers. According to Sakai, Sasai's decision was poor, but he and the rest of the pilots sympathized with him because bombers had been hitting their base regularly and that they all wanted to get a piece of the B-17s that had been giving them so much trouble.

On August 2, Sasai attacked a B-17 using a new head-on tactic, shooting the four-engined bomber down.

Rabaul

The Tainan Air Group moved from Lae to Lakunai airfield on Rabaul the next day. Rabaul soon would be named "the fighter pilot graveyard" by the Japanese not only because of the fierce combat, but also because malaria, mosquitoes and various tropical diseases decimated the Japanese pilots. Unlike the Americans, who treated their airbases with DDT, the Japanese had no similar solution.

On August 7, word arrived that U.S. Marines had landed at 5:20 that morning on Guadalcanal. Due to bad weather, the Allied expeditionary force had arrived undetected by the Japanese. Without delay, 17 Zeros of the Tainan Group escorted 27 Mitsubishi G4M Betty bombers of the 4th Ku. in an attack on the U.S. Navy task force supporting the invasion. The Japanese were met by 18 Grumman F4F-4 Wildcat fighters and 16 Douglas Douglas SBD-3 Dauntless dive bombers from the aircraft carriers Saratoga, Enterprise and Wasp. From mid-1942, F4F Wildcat fighter pilots used a new aerial combat tactic, the "Thach Weave", developed by the US naval aviators John Thach and Edward O'Hare. The Zero pilots from Rabaul were initially confounded by this double-team maneuver. Nevertheless, Sasai was credited with five F4Fs in this first air battle between land-based Zeros and American carrier fighters.

During this same engagement, Saburō Sakai, leading the second section in Sasai's squadron, sustained grievous injuries from the return fire of  carrier-based bombers he had mistaken for Wildcats. After a few days in the hospital, Sakai was informed that he would be returning to Japan for eye surgery. The evening before his departure, Sasai bade him farewell at his bedside, giving him his tiger-head belt buckle and saying to him, "Please go back to Japan and please come back to Rabaul!"

Final mission

On August 26, 1942, on his 76th sortie with the Tainan Group, Sasai led eight Zeros escorting Betty bombers to Henderson Field, a main focus of months of fighting in the Guadalcanal campaign, as it enabled U.S. land-based airpower to hinder the Japanese attempts at resupplying its soldiers. At that time, Sasai's score stood at 27. Over Guadalcanal, Sasai attacked an F4F Wildcat. The Wildcat dived for the cover of antiaircraft guns, then gave chase.  The Zero turned to engage from overhead; the Grumman pulled its nose into the vertical, firing its six .50-caliber machine guns. The lack of self-sealing fuel tanks made Japanese Zeros easy to ignite with a few rounds of incendiary tracers. Sasai's Zero exploded in a ball of fire, showering parts onto the beach of Guadalcanal in front of hundreds of U.S. Marines.

Lieutenant Junichi Sasai died at the age of 24. He was probably the target of Captain (later Major) Marion E. Carl, an 18.5-victory ace of Marine squadron VMF-223, one of the few Midway-based pilots to survive the Battle of Midway. He had been one of the first Marine pilots to land at Henderson Field less than a week before, and since then, he had downed three more aircraft to become the Marine Corps’ first ace.  Sasai, a lieutenant junior grade, was posthumously promoted two grades to lieutenant commander. This practice was common for Japanese aviators with proven records or high scores who were killed during the war. Sasai was also honored with a mention in an all-units bulletin of the Japanese Navy.

With his father, he is buried at Tama Cemetery in Fuchū, Tokyo.

Notes

References
 "Samurai!" by Saburo Sakai, Fred Saito and Martin Caidin
 "Osprey Aircraft of the Aces No. 22 - Imperial Japanese Navy Aces 1937-45" by Henry Sakaida
 "Winged Samurai - Saburo Sakai and the Zero Fighter Pilots" by H. Sakaida, Champlin Fighter Museum, 1985, 
 "Ozora no Samurai" ("Samurai of the Sky"), a Toho movie from 1976, Lieutenant Junichi Sasai is played by Taro Shigaki

External links
 A6M2 Zeros of the Tainan Kōkūtai
 Tainan Kōkūtai Zero "V-128"

1918 births
1942 deaths
Aviators killed by being shot down
Japanese military personnel of World War II
Imperial Japanese Navy officers
Japanese World War II flying aces
Japanese military personnel killed in World War II
Japanese naval aviators